Charles William Bates (September 17, 1907 – January 29, 1980) was an American Major League Baseball outfielder. He played for the Philadelphia Athletics during the  season.

References

Major League Baseball outfielders
Philadelphia Athletics players
Martinsburg Blue Sox players
Baseball players from Pennsylvania
1907 births
1980 deaths